Nanotoxicology is a peer-reviewed, scientific journal that focuses on environmental exposure, hazard, and risk of applied nanostructured materials. It publishes research that addresses the potentially toxic interactions between nanostructured materials and living matter. The journal publishes the results of studies that enhance safety during the production, use, and disposal of nanomaterials. The editor-in-chief is Håkan Wallin (National Research Centre for the Working Environment, Denmark).

According to the Journal Citation Reports, its 2020 impact factor is 5.913.

See also 
 Toxicology
 Risk assessment
 Ecotoxicology
 Nanomedicine

References

External links 
 

Publications established in 2007
Nanotechnology journals
Toxicology journals
Taylor & Francis academic journals
Quarterly journals
English-language journals